Unico was a technology transfer organization that represented the Technology Exploitation companies of UK Universities. It was founded in 1994. In October 2009 it merged with Praxis (founded in 2002) and is now known as PraxisUnico.

Unico's website stated that "It provides a forum for exchange and development of best practice. Member companies transfer technology and expertise through the formation of Spin-out companies, licensing, consultancy, training, design and development projects, contract research, testing and evaluation, and problem solving."

References

External links
 PraxisUnico website

1994 establishments in England
Educational institutions established in 1994
Innovation in the United Kingdom
Innovation organizations
Knowledge transfer
Universities and colleges in the United Kingdom
University organizations